This article lists the figure skaters who reached the highest ranking among their compatriots since the 2001–02 season. The rankings used are season-end ISU World Standings.

Discipline 
The remainder of this section is a complete list, by discipline, of all skaters who reached the highest ranking among their compatriots since the 2001–02 season.

Men's singles 

*HS for Highest season-end world Standing. †Statistics since the 2001–02 season.

Women's singles 

*HS for Highest season-end world Standing. †Statistics since the 2001–02 season.

Pairs 

*HS for Highest season-end world Standing. †Statistics since the 2001–02 season.

Ice dance 

*HS for Highest season-end world Standing. †Statistics since the 2001–02 season.

IOC country code 
The remainder of this section is a complete list, by IOC country codes, of all skaters who reached the highest ranking among their compatriots since the 2001–02 season.

Argentina (ARG) 

*HS for Highest season-end world Standing. †Statistics since the 2001–02 season.

Armenia (ARM) 

*HS for Highest season-end world Standing. †Statistics since the 2001–02 season.

Australia (AUS) 

*HS for Highest season-end world Standing. †Statistics since the 2001–02 season.

Austria (AUT) 

*HS for Highest season-end world Standing. †Statistics since the 2001–02 season.

Azerbaijan  (AZE) 

*HS for Highest season-end world Standing. †Statistics since the 2001–02 season.

Belgium (BEL) 

*HS for Highest season-end world Standing. †Statistics since the 2001–02 season.

Belarus (BLR) 

*HS for Highest season-end world Standing. †Statistics since the 2001–02 season.

Brazil (BRA) 

*HS for Highest season-end world Standing. †Statistics since the 2001–02 season.

Bulgaria (BUL) 

*HS for Highest season-end world Standing. †Statistics since the 2001–02 season.

Canada (CAN) 

*HS for Highest season-end world Standing. †Statistics since the 2001–02 season.

China (CHN) 

*HS for Highest season-end world Standing. †Statistics since the 2001–02 season.

Croatia (CRO) 

*HS for Highest season-end world Standing. †Statistics since the 2001–02 season.

Czech Republic (CZE) 

*HS for Highest season-end world Standing. †Statistics since the 2001–02 season.

Denmark (DEN) 

*HS for Highest season-end world Standing. †Statistics since the 2001–02 season.

Spain (ESP)

*HS for Highest season-end world Standing. †Statistics since the 2001–02 season.

Estonia (EST) 

*HS for Highest season-end world Standing. †Statistics since the 2001–02 season.

Finland (FIN) 

*HS for Highest season-end world Standing. †Statistics since the 2001–02 season.

France (FRA) 

*HS for Highest season-end world Standing. †Statistics since the 2001–02 season.

Great Britain (GBR) 

*HS for Highest season-end world Standing. †Statistics since the 2001–02 season.

Georgia (GEO) 

*HS for Highest season-end world Standing. †Statistics since the 2001–02 season.

Germany (GER) 

*HS for Highest season-end world Standing. †Statistics since the 2001–02 season.

Greece (GRE) 

*HS for Highest season-end world Standing. †Statistics since the 2001–02 season.

Hong Kong (HKG) 

*HS for Highest season-end world Standing. †Statistics since the 2001–02 season.

Hungry (HUN) 

*HS for Highest season-end world Standing. †Statistics since the 2001–02 season.

India (IND) 

*HS for Highest season-end world Standing. †Statistics since the 2001–02 season.

Irland (IRL) 

*HS for Highest season-end world Standing. †Statistics since the 2001–02 season.

Israel (ISR) 

*HS for Highest season-end world Standing. †Statistics since the 2001–02 season.

Italy (ITA) 

*HS for Highest season-end world Standing. †Statistics since the 2001–02 season.

Japan (JPN) 

*HS for Highest season-end world Standing. †Statistics since the 2001–02 season.

Kazakhstan (KAZ) 

*HS for Highest season-end world Standing. †Statistics since the 2001–02 season.

South Korea (KOR) 

*HS for Highest season-end world Standing. †Statistics since the 2001–02 season.

Latvia (LAT) 

*HS for Highest season-end world Standing. †Statistics since the 2001–02 season.

Lithuania (LTU) 

*HS for Highest season-end world Standing. †Statistics since the 2001–02 season.

Luxembourg (LUX) 

*HS for Highest season-end world Standing. †Statistics since the 2001–02 season.

Malayasia (MAS) 

*HS for Highest season-end world Standing. †Statistics since the 2001–02 season.

Mexico (MEX) 

*HS for Highest season-end world Standing. †Statistics since the 2001–02 season.

Monaco (MON) 

*HS for Highest season-end world Standing. †Statistics since the 2001–02 season.

Netherlands (NED) 

*HS for Highest season-end world Standing. †Statistics since the 2001–02 season.

Norway (NOR) 

*HS for Highest season-end world Standing. †Statistics since the 2001–02 season.

New Zealand (NZL) 

*HS for Highest season-end world Standing. †Statistics since the 2001–02 season.

Philippines (PHI) 

*HS for Highest season-end world Standing. †Statistics since the 2001–02 season.

Poland (POL) 

*HS for Highest season-end world Standing. †Statistics since the 2001–02 season.

North Korea (PRK) 

*HS for Highest season-end world Standing. †Statistics since the 2001–02 season.

Puerto Rico (PUR) 

*HS for Highest season-end world Standing. †Statistics since the 2001–02 season.

Romania (ROU) 

*HS for Highest season-end world Standing. †Statistics since the 2001–02 season.

South Africa (RSA) 

*HS for Highest season-end world Standing. †Statistics since the 2001–02 season.

Russian (RUS) 

*HS for Highest season-end world Standing. †Statistics since the 2001–02 season.

Singapore (SGP) 

*HS for Highest season-end world Standing. †Statistics since the 2001–02 season.

Slovenia (SLO) 

*HS for Highest season-end world Standing. †Statistics since the 2001–02 season.

Serbia (SRB) 

*HS for Highest season-end world Standing. †Statistics since the 2001–02 season.

Switzerland (SUI) 

*HS for Highest season-end world Standing. †Statistics since the 2001–02 season.

Slovakia (SVK) 

*HS for Highest season-end world Standing. †Statistics since the 2001–02 season.

Sweden (SWE) 

*HS for Highest season-end world Standing. †Statistics since the 2001–02 season.

Thailand (THA) 

*HS for Highest season-end world Standing. †Statistics since the 2001–02 season.

Chinese Taipei (TPE) 

*HS for Highest season-end world Standing. †Statistics since the 2001–02 season.

Turkey (TUR) 

*HS for Highest season-end world Standing. †Statistics since the 2001–02 season.

Ukraine (UKR) 

*HS for Highest season-end world Standing. †Statistics since the 2001–02 season.

United States (USA) 

*HS for Highest season-end world Standing. †Statistics since the 2001–02 season.

Uzbekistan (UZB) 

*HS for Highest season-end world Standing. †Statistics since the 2001–02 season.

See also 
 Figure skating records and statistics
 ISU World Standings and Season's World Ranking
 List of ISU World Standings and Season's World Ranking statistics
 Major achievements in figure skating by nation

References

External links 
 International Skating Union
 ISU World standings for Single & Pair Skating and Ice Dance / ISU Season's World Ranking

ISU World Standings and Season's World Ranking
Highest ranked skaters by nation
Highest ranked skaters by nation